Şenol Coşkun (November 12, 1988 – November 29, 2006) was a Turkish child actor.

Biography
Born in Istanbul, Coşkun was a fan of the Galatasaray S.K. during his early childhood. In 1995, he pursued a career in acting when he met the film director Ünal Küpeli and starred in his film Zıpçıktı in which he portrayed  the lead role. The film is an adaptation of the 1990 film Problem Child.

Coşkun was among Turkey's most popular child actors following the success of Zıpçıktı. On television, he was often featured as a supporting character in soap operas starring Haluk Bilginer.

Death
Coşkun was killed in a car crash in Istanbul on November 29, 2006, two and a half weeks after his 18th birthday.

References

External links

1988 births
2006 deaths
Male actors from Istanbul
Turkish male film actors
Turkish male television actors
Turkish male soap opera actors
Turkish male child actors
20th-century Turkish male actors
21st-century Turkish male actors
Road incident deaths in Turkey